The French naval base of Djibouti, also known as the Naval base of Héron, is located in East Africa in Djibouti.

References

Installations of the French Navy
Military installations of France in other countries
Djibouti–France relations